Iridomyrmex tenuiceps is a species of ant in the genus Iridomyrmex. Described by Heterick and Shattuck in 2011, the species is widespread in Australia.

Etymology
The name derives from the Latin Language, and is in reference to the slender head of the species.

References

Iridomyrmex
Hymenoptera of Australia
Insects described in 2011